Constance Margaret Fisher (née Sirois; March 26, 1929 – October 1, 1973) was an American serial killer. A paranoid schizophrenic, she killed three of her children in rural Maine in 1954, and after spending several years in a mental institution, she was released, only to kill three more of her children in 1966.

Deemed unfit to stand trial, she was hospitalized at the Augusta State Hospital, from where she managed to escape in 1973, but died in an accident shortly afterwards.

Early life
Constance Margaret Sirois was born on March 26, 1929, in Oakland, Maine. She was abandoned by her birth parents, and later adopted by the Sirois family. Neighbors described Constance as a pretty and nice girl, although she was also considered "moody".

In 1946, the 17-year-old Sirois married 24-year-old Carl Marion Fisher, a WWII veteran employed at a car shop in the Maine Central Railroad. The couple moved to a little home in Waterville, where they would have three children over the following years - Richard (b. 1947), Daniel (b. 1948) and Deborah Kay (b. 1953).

During these years, Constance started to exhibit signs of anxiety and depression, frequently worrying about her children, money, and the cramped home the family lived in. She also attempted to commit suicide on at least one occasion, but was unsuccessful.

Murders

First incident
On March 8, 1954, Carl returned home from work, but found that the door had been locked. Worried that something was off, he contacted Dr. Richard Chasse, the physician who had been treating his wife for recent bouts of depression, and the men broke down the door. Carl then went inside and went to the bedroom, where he saw Daniel and Deborah tucked in their beds, appearing to be asleep. He then stepped into the bathroom, where he found that his eldest son Richard had been drowned in the bathtub.

Panicked and unable to find his wife, he quickly contacted the authorities, who rushed to the crime scene. A search of the house led to the officers finding Constance hidden under a bed, having been rendered unconscious from a failed suicide attempt by drinking a bottle of liquid shampoo. A suicide note written by her was located, with Constance explaining that she had drowned the children to "save them from evil" and that God had ordered her to do so.

Internment and release
Soon after she was found, Constance was arrested and charged with murder. The killings came as a shock to the community, who struggled to believe that she was capable of doing such a thing. Before she was able to stand trial, a forensic psychiatric examination concluded that she was suffering from paranoid schizophrenia and was thus considered unable to stand trial.

Because of this, Constance was interned at the Augusta State Hospital in Augusta for treatment. While hospitalized there, she calmly explained that she had drowned the children one by one and she had done it because, as she claimed to one psychiatrist, "[she] wanted to someone to baby [her]." In order to cure her, Fisher was given insulin injections and high doses of hormones, which would sometimes cause her to experience seizures.

Within a year of her internment, she started to show signs of improvement, no longer hearing voices or experiencing any auditory hallucinations. In 1955, her husband initiated a legal process to have her released, but his requests were denied by the hospital's medical board. After four years, partly due to a national effort to deinstitutionalize mental patients, Constance was released to her husband's custody on March 6, 1959.

The couple soon moved to a new home Carl had built for the family in Fairfield, where they would have three more children -  Kathleen Louise (b. 1960), Michael Jon (b. 1962) and Natalie Rose (b. 1965).

Second incident
On June 30, 1966, Carl returned home from work, only to find 9-month-old Natalie drowned in the bathtub. Shocked by the discovery, he ran towards the home of neighbor Howard Wood to use his telephone, as his home did not have one. Police were called to the scene, and after examining the crime scene, officers found the bodies of Michael and Kathleen tucked in their beds. Constance herself was also found lying in her bed, having been rendered unconscious from a failed suicide attempt to overdose on pills. Newspapers at the time noted the eerie similarities with the previous murders, calling it a "duplication of tragedy".

Constance was rushed to the Thayer Hospital in Waterville, where she was nursed until she regained consciousness. Local authorities sought to charge her with murder, and after she was discharged, Constance was brought to Skowhegan in Somerset County for deliberations between prosecutors, before a decision was made for her to be tried in Kennebec County.

Murder charges and hospitalization
Following her arraignment and while she was being held without bail, Attorney General Richard Dubord announced that the State would not request that the defendant undergo psychiatric treatment. Skowhegan-based attorney George W. Perkins was appointed as her attorney, while Dubord would be assisted by John Benoit and Richard Cohen. During a formal hearing, Dr. Price Kirkpatrick, a psychiatrist, stated that he believed that Constance suffered from bouts of depression because she had not been taking her medication properly.

After a day of testimonies from the prosecution and the defense, the court ordered that Constance must undergo a psychiatric examination at the Augusta State Hospital in order to determine how competent she was to stand trial. The results of said examination concluded that she was stable enough to stand trial, and Constance was soon charged with the murders of Kathleen, Michael and Natalie. During the reading of the third indictment, she sobbed as she entered her pleas of not guilty by reason of insanity, but soon regained her composure.

During the testimonies, the prosecution questioned several witnesses, including Capt. Albert Dross of the Waterville Police Department and Dr. Joseph J. Hiebel of the Thayer Hospital. Both men claimed that during interrogations with the defendant, she had given clear and cohesive answers to their inquiries, with Dross adding that he had found a gun and a knife in the house which he said Constance planned to kill herself with.

In spite of their attempts to have her convicted, her defense counsel managed to convince the court that Constance was insane, and the Judge eventually ruled that she should be confined to the Augusta State Hospital for the rest of her natural life.

Escape and death
During her hospitalization, Constance reportedly caused no problems and behaved well towards the staff. This all changed on October 1, 1973, when her husband Carl decided to stop visiting her, as it caused him too much grief. Not long after, she somehow managed to escape from the Augusta State Hospital, prompting a search operation from hospital staff and local authorities.

On October 9, a group of duck hunters spotted the bloated body of a woman floating in the Kennebec River near Gardiner. An autopsy determined that the body belonged to Constance Fisher, and her death was listed as an accidental drowning, likely to have occurred on the day of her escape. Her death prompted the hospital's superintendent, Roy Ettlinger, to criticize the practise of milieu therapy on patients, as he believed this increased the risk of them committing suicide.

Constance's body was later buried at the family's graveyard plot in Waterville. When Carl Fisher died in 1990, his body was also interned in the same plot as his wife and all of their six children.

See also
 List of serial killers in the United States

References

Bibliography
 

1929 births
1973 deaths
20th-century American criminals
American female criminals
American female serial killers
Serial mass murderers
American murderers of children
Filicides in the United States
People acquitted by reason of insanity
Accidental deaths in Maine
People with schizophrenia
American adoptees
Criminals from Maine
People from Oakland, Maine